Arctosa is a wolf spider species found in Europe and Russia.

See also 
 List of Lycosidae species

References

External links 

figurata
Spiders of Europe
Spiders of Russia
Spiders described in 1876